Albert Edmond Louis Roussin, baron (2 August 1821, Brest – 28 September 1896, Paris) was a French vice-admiral and politician. He was first commissioned captain in 1859. He was Naval Minister from 23 November to 12 December 1877. He was the son of Albin Roussin.

References

1821 births
1896 deaths
French Naval Ministers